Chapeshlu (also romanized as Chāpeshlū and Chāpishlu; formerly, Chāvosh and Chowveshlī) is a city and capital of Chapeshlu District, in Dargaz County, Razavi Khorasan Province, Iran. At the 2006 census, its population was 2,247, in 616 families.

References 

Populated places in Dargaz County
Cities in Razavi Khorasan Province